The 2018–19 San Jose State Spartans women's basketball team represents San Jose State University in the 2018–19 NCAA Division I women's basketball season. The Spartans were led by sixth-year head coach Jamie Craighead and play home games at the Event Center Arena as a member of the Mountain West Conference. They finished the season 6–24, 5–13 in Mountain West play to finish in ninth place. They lost in the first round of the Mountain West women's tournament to Nevada.

Roster

Schedule

|-
!colspan=12 style=| Exhibition

|-
!colspan=12 style=| Non-conference regular season

|-
!colspan=12 style=| Mountain West regular season

|-
!colspan=12 style=| Mountain West Women's Tournament

See also
 2018–19 San Jose State Spartans men's basketball team

References

San Jose State Spartans women's basketball seasons
San Jose State